Ricardo Pérez-Marco (born 1967) is a Spanish mathematician at the Université Paris XIII. He won the 1996 EMS Prize for his work on dynamical systems.

Born in Barcelona, Pérez-Marco studied at the École Normale Supérieure. He then earned his doctorate from Université de Paris-Sud in 1990, under supervision of Jean-Christophe Yoccoz.

References

External links
 Website at Université Paris XIII

1967 births
Living people
20th-century Spanish mathematicians
University of Paris alumni
People from Barcelona
International Mathematical Olympiad participants
21st-century Spanish mathematicians